Lehlohonolo Carreca Nonyane (born 7 December 1986) is a South African professional footballer, who currently plays for South African Premier Division club Marumo Gallants as a defender.

References 

1986 births
Living people
South African soccer players
Association football defenders
Jomo Cosmos F.C. players
Mpumalanga Black Aces F.C. players
Cape Town City F.C. (2016) players
Lamontville Golden Arrows F.C. players
Bidvest Wits F.C. players
Tshakhuma Tsha Madzivhandila F.C. players
Marumo Gallants F.C. players
South African Premier Division players
National First Division players
South Africa international soccer players